Beihai Tunnel may refer to:

 Beihai Tunnel (Beigan)
 Beihai Tunnel (Nangan)